Briscoe Group is a New Zealand retail chain. It has 84 stores throughout New Zealand trading under the Briscoes Homeware, Living & Giving and Rebel Sport nameplates.

History 

The Briscoe Group originally started out as the early version of the "Briscoes Homeware" branding.  In 1781 the brand was initially founded in Wolverhampton, England and steadily expanded into the British Colonies including Australia & New Zealand.  The first New Zealand based Briscoes warehouse and store was established in 1862 on the corner of Princes and Jetty Street in Dunedin, New Zealand. It began as a retailer aimed at supplying prospecting hardware (including shovels, picks, tents and lanterns).
 1973: Australian and New Zealand operations of Briscoes purchased by Merbank Corporation of Australia.
 1977: Hagemeyer of The Netherlands purchases Briscoes New Zealand.
 1988: Hagemeyer recruits Rodney Adrian Duke as managing director of Briscoes. His mandate was to prepare the business for sale.
 1990: Briscoes bought by the RA Duke Trust, a trust established by Rodney Adrian Duke.
 1991: Briscoes hires Brian Berry to oversee the expansion and renovation of the Briscoes retail stores.
 1995: Briscoes negotiates a limited franchise agreement with Rebel Sport Australia, giving Briscoes exclusive rights to the Rebel Sport brand in New Zealand.
 1996: Under the direction and guidance of Brian Berry, the first Rebel Sport store opens in Panmure, Auckland.
 1997: First Rebel Sport store outside of Auckland opens.
 1999: Agreement with Rebel Sport Australia for the franchise to be terminated with effect from April 2005, after which Briscoe will continue to have exclusive rights to the name in New Zealand.
 2001: Retailing interests total 28 Briscoes stores and 11 Rebel Sport stores. Briscoe Group goes public and lists on the New Zealand Stock Exchange (NZX).
 2003: Retailing interests total 30 Briscoes stores and 17 Rebel Sport stores.
 2004: Retailing interests total 33 Briscoes stores and 19 Rebel Sport stores.
 2006: Retailing interests total 48 Briscoes stores, 27 Rebel Sport stores, and 9 Living and Giving stores.
 2008: Retailing interests total 57 Briscoes stores, 32 Rebel Sport stores, and 9 Living and Giving stores.
 2012: Briscoes Homeware celebrates 150 years in business.
 2016: Retailing interests total 44 Briscoes stores, 36 Rebel Sport stores, and 4 Living and Giving stores.
 2019: Retailing interests total 45 Briscoes stores, 38 Rebel Sport stores, and 1 Living and Giving store.

Nameplates

Briscoes 

Briscoes or Briscoes Homeware is a retail store selling a variety of homeware at sometimes heavily discounted prices. It is comparable in size to a medium size discount department store. Many brands are exclusively imported by Briscoes, allowing for such low prices. Briscoes Homeware is the flagship brand of the Group and generates most of the company's revenue. Currently there are 45 stores trading throughout New Zealand. The brand's slogan is "You'll never buy better", referring to Briscoes Homeware's 'Price Promise' that states the store will match and beat by 10% any price found on a stocked item at another retailer.

Tammy Wells, a farmer and former radio journalist from Canterbury, has fronted Briscoes' television advertising campaigns since 1989. She is known to New Zealanders as "The Briscoes Lady".

Rebel Sport 

Rebel Sport is the largest sport equipment and apparel chain in New Zealand, with 38 stores currently trading. It was born out of a franchise agreement between Briscoe Group and Rebel Sport Australia in 1995. After successfully overseeing the expansion of the Briscoes Homeware stores from 12 to 22, then company director, Brian Berry, was given the task of overseeing the design and establishment of the Rebel Sport chain of stores in New Zealand. Briscoe has exclusive rights to the Rebel Sport name in New Zealand.

Like its sister nameplate Briscoes, Rebel Sport is comparable in size to a medium size discount department store. The chain does have a lowest price guarantee, although its unique duopoly position in the market allows it to stock a relatively high-end range while providing wider appeal through a calendar crammed with discount sale promotions.

In 2005, a deal collapsed between Briscoe Group and Lane Walker Rudkin (LWR), owners of Stirling Sports, which would have seen Briscoe buy out the Stirling franchise. Following this, LWR announced plans to launch several large format stores across the country, beginning with a store in Christchurch, which it opened in mid-2006.

After Stirling's big box launch, Rebel dropped their original slogan, "No one's got more sports gear", and replaced it with "Let's Play", beginning a new marketing campaign targeting a wider audience from their traditional club-orientated team sport audience. The company continued their aggressive expansion programme, launching several smaller-format stores such as Napier and Taupo to allow branches to reach further into provincial areas.

Briscoe Group has previously owned the naming rights to the New Zealand segment of the Super 14 rugby union competition, which was branded the Rebel Sport Super 14.

References

External links 
 
 
 Briscoes Homeware
 Briscoes Australia
 Rebel Sport
 Living & Giving

Companies based in Wolverhampton
Companies based in Auckland
1781 establishments in England
British companies established in 1781